Knight of 100 Faces is a 1960 Italian swashbuckler film directed  by Pino Mercanti  and starring Lex Barker and Liana Orfei.

Plot

Cast 
 
Lex Barker as  Riccardo d'Arce 
Liana Orfei as  Zuela
Livio Lorenzon as  Count Fosco Di Vallebruna
Annie Alberti as  Bianca di Pallanza
Herbert A.E. Böhme as  Duke Ambrogio Di Pallanza
Tina Lattanzi as  Ausonia
Alvaro Piccardi as  Ciro Di Pallanza
Dina De Santis as  Cinzia
Franco Fantasia as  Captain  d'Argentero / Silver Knight
Roberto Altamura as  Rino
Fedele Gentile as  Giovanni
Gérard Landry as  Captain of the Guards
Giovanni Vari as  Quinto 
Giulio Battiferri as  Bertuccio
Ignazio Balsamo as  Fosco's Servant
Gianni Solaro as  Judge Del Torneo

References

External links

  
1960 adventure films
1960 films
Italian adventure films 
Italian swashbuckler films
Films directed by Pino Mercanti
1960s Italian-language films
1960s Italian films